is a Japanese volleyball player. Although her nickname is "yuu", Ai Otomo already had that nickname on the All-Japan women's Team, so she was given the new nickname "kaoru". Her nickname in television broadcasts is "koushuni kagayaku Kaoru-hime", (攻守に輝くカオル姫, translation: "Princess Kaoru who shines in offense and defense"). Also, she is sometimes known as "shiroi yousei" (白い妖精, translation: "White fairy") due in part to her fair skin. However, she is embarrassed to be called "Princess Kaoru" or "White fairy". She belongs to the volleyball team JT Marvelous of the V.League.  In May 2008, she retired from the team and from organized volleyball.

She married volleyball player Koichi Nishimura in 2011.

References

External links
JT Marvelous (in Japanese)
White fairy~ Kaoru Sugayama fansite (in Japanese)
Kaoru Sugayama's fansite (in Japanese)
MarvelousYOU (in Japanese)

Japanese women's volleyball players
1978 births
Living people
Sportspeople from Miyagi Prefecture
Asian Games medalists in volleyball
Volleyball players at the 2006 Asian Games
Asian Games silver medalists for Japan
Medalists at the 2006 Asian Games